The Lovers of Valdaro, also known as the "Valdaro Lovers," are a pair of human skeletons dated as approximately 6,000 years old. They were discovered by archaeologists at a Neolithic tomb in San Giorgio near Mantua, Italy, in 2007. The two individuals were buried face to face with their arms around each other, in a position reminiscent of a "lovers' embrace".

Archaeologist Elena Maria Menotti led the excavation.
The male skeleton was found with a flint arrowhead near the neck. The female had a long flint blade along the thigh, plus two flint knives under the pelvis. Osteological examination found no evidence of violent death, no fractures, and no microtrauma, so the most likely explanation is the flint tools were buried along with the people as grave goods.

The skeletons were displayed briefly in public for the first time in September 2011 at the National Archaeological Museum of Mantua, thanks to the effort of the association Lovers in Mantua which was seeking a permanent home for the ancient couple.

Seven years after their discovery, on 11 April 2014, they were permanently displayed inside a glass case in the museum, which is within the perimeter of the Ducal palace of Mantua.

See also
 Embracing Skeletons of Alepotrypa
 Hasanlu Lovers
 List of unsolved deaths
 Lovers of Cluj-Napoca
 Lovers of Modena
 Lovers of Teruel

References

2007 archaeological discoveries
Archaeology of Italy
Archaeology of death
Burial monuments and structures
Couples
Human remains (archaeological)
Mantua
Skeletons
Unsolved deaths